Lee School is a historic one-room school building located at Montour in Schuyler County, New York.  It is a one-room, one story, gable roofed frame building built in 1884.  It served the town as Montour District #1 School until 1937.

It was listed on the National Register of Historic Places in 1998.

References

One-room schoolhouses in New York (state)
Schoolhouses in the United States
School buildings on the National Register of Historic Places in New York (state)
School buildings completed in 1884
Buildings and structures in Schuyler County, New York
National Register of Historic Places in Schuyler County, New York
1884 establishments in New York (state)